Sathiamoorty Saravanan (born 22 September 1978) is an Indian cricketer. He played 46 first-class and 44 List A matches between 1997 and 2011. He was also part of India's squad for the 1998 Under-19 Cricket World Cup.

References

External links
 

1978 births
Living people
Indian cricketers
Assam cricketers
Goa cricketers
Tamil Nadu cricketers
People from Namakkal district